Sir Vincent Serei Eri  (12 September 1936 – 25 May 1993) was a Papua New Guinean politician who served as the fifth governor-general of Papua New Guinea from February 1990 to October 1991.

Life 
Eri attended the University of Papua New Guinea. Upon graduation, he worked as a school teacher and later became the director of education. In 1975, he was appointed Papua New Guinea's first Consul General in Australia. From 1975 to 1979, he also served as High Commissioner. Together with Ted Diro, he founded the People's Action Party in 1986 and was elected to the National Parliament.

He succeeded Kingsford Dibela as Governor-General of Papua New Guinea on 27 February 1990 and was awarded the Knight Grand Cross of the Order of St Michael and St George. Shortly after taking office, he was faced with a constitutional crisis. Ted Diro, now the Deputy Prime Minister, had been found guilty of corruption. The constitution required the Governor-General to dismiss him, but he did not. This created some controversy, and there were calls for Eri himself to leave office, which he did not. Ultimately, Prime Minister Rabbie Namaliu sent a formal request to Queen Elizabeth II to replace him.

On 4 October 1991, before Namaliu's request could be acted upon, Eri resigned from office. He died at his home in Port Moresby on 25 May 1993, aged 56, leaving six children.

The Crocodile 
He is often cited as being the first Papua New Guinean national to publish a book in English; The Crocodile (a novel), which was published in 1970. However, in 1932, the country's first Methodist Priest, known as "Ligeremaluoga", published an autobiography that was translated as The Erstwhile Savage. 

The Crocodile is about the colonial period. Its title refers partially to a crocodile in Moveave and partially to the assistant district officer, Jim Green, who received the main character, Hoiri, together with other Fuzzy Wuzzy Angels in Lae during World War II. It was compulsory reading in secondary schools during the 1970s and 80s. In 2011, the Crocodile Prize was established as an annual literary award.

See also 
 Culture of Papua New Guinea

References 
 Lentz, Harris M., III. Heads of States and Governments. Jefferson, NC: McFarland & Company, 1994. .
 Vincent Serei Eri, 57, Leader in Papua Land

External links 
 The Crocodile Prize home page

1936 births
1993 deaths
Governors-General of Papua New Guinea
Members of the National Parliament of Papua New Guinea
Papua New Guinean novelists
Knights Grand Cross of the Order of St Michael and St George
People from Gulf Province
University of Papua New Guinea alumni
20th-century novelists